Kullamaa Manuscript is a manuscript which is considered to be the oldest source containing longer texts (in total about 150 words) in Estonian language. These texts are written ca 1524-1532 by clergymen Johannes Lelow and its successor Konderth Gulerth.

Manuscript consists two prays ("Pater noster" and "Ave Maria") and one credo ("Credo").

The texts were discovered in 1923 by Paul Johansen. The texts are reposited in Tallinn City Archives.

References

Further reading
 T. Põld. Kullamaa katekismus. Bielefeld-Tartu, 1996

Estonian books
Estonian language
1524 books